Benita Puértolas (died 4 September 1968, in Buenos Aires) was an Argentine film and theatre actress. She was the mother of the film actor Héctor Coire.

Filmography
 Lo que le pasó a Reynoso   (1955) 
 La mujer desnuda   (1955) 
 El complejo de Felipe   (1951) 
 La comedia inmortal   (1951) 
 Avivato   (1949) 
 El extraño caso de la mujer asesinada   (1949) 
 Los secretos del buzón   (1948) 
 Recuerdos de un ángel   (1948) 
 Siete para un secreto   (1947)
 Soy un infeliz   (1946) 
 El Capitán Pérez   (1946) 
 Cinco besos   (1945) 
 Mi novia es un fantasma   (1944) 
 Eclipse de sol   (1943) 
 Los ojos más lindos del mundo   (1943) 
 Locos de verano   (1942) 
 Boina blanca   (1941) 
 Corazón de turco   (1940) 
 Los muchachos se divierten   (1940) 
 Entre el barro   (1939) 
 Jettatore   (1938) 
 Los locos del cuarto piso   (1937) 
 La vuelta de Rocha   (1937)
 Radio Bar   (1936) 
 Poncho blanco   (1936) 
 Canillita   (1936) 
 La muchachada de a bordo   (1936) 
 Los tres berretines   (1933)

References

External links

Date of birth missing
1968 deaths
Argentine film actresses
Argentine stage actresses
20th-century Argentine actresses